James Graves Scrugham (January 19, 1880 – June 23, 1945) was an American politician. He was a Representative, a Senator, and the 14th Governor of the U.S. state of Nevada. He was a member of the Democratic Party.

Biography
Scrugham was born in Lexington, Kentucky, in 1880.  He graduated from the University of Kentucky at Lexington in 1900, and received his master's degree in 1906.  He was a professor of mechanical engineering at the University of Nevada from 1903 to 1914.  He was dean of the school of engineering from 1913 to 1917.

During the First World War, he was commissioned as a major in the United States Army in 1917 and was promoted to the rank of lieutenant colonel in 1918.  After the war, he remained in the military as a member of the Organized Reserve Corps.  He was state public service commissioner from 1919 to 1923.  He was the Governor of Nevada between 1923 and 1927.  He was the editor and publisher of the Nevada State Journal from 1927 to 1932.  He became a special adviser to the Secretary of the Interior on Colorado River development projects in 1927.

Later, he was elected as a Democrat to Congress and served from 1933 until December 7, 1942, when he resigned, having been elected  to the United States Senate to fill the unexpired term of Key Pittman on November 3, 1942.  Scrugham served from December 7, 1942, until his death on June 23, 1945, in San Diego, California, at the age of 65.

The James G. Scrugham Engineering & Mines Building, opened in 1963, houses the dean's office and several departments in the College of Engineering, as well as the Nevada Bureau of Mines and Geology.

See also
 List of United States Congress members who died in office (1900–49)

References

External links

1880 births
1945 deaths
Democratic Party governors of Nevada
Politicians from Lexington, Kentucky
Editors of Nevada newspapers
Military personnel from Kentucky
Military personnel from Nevada
University of Kentucky alumni
Democratic Party United States senators from Nevada
Democratic Party members of the United States House of Representatives from Nevada
20th-century American politicians